Puli is a 2010 Indian Telugu-language action thriller film written and directed by S. J. Suryah, starring Pawan Kalyan in the lead role, with Nikeesha Patel, Manoj Bajpayee, Saranya Ponvannan, Charan Raj, Nassar, and Ali in supporting roles. The film features a proper Telugu soundtrack by A. R. Rahman (after a long gap) and cinematography by Binod Pradhan. It was produced by Singanamala Ramesh Babu, on a  40 crore budget and was distributed by Geetha Arts. The film was released on 10 September. 

Originally titled Komaram Puli, it was renamed as Puli on the second day of release, following objections by Komaram Sony Rao, grandson of the tribal legend Komaram Bheem, from whose name the title of the movie was taken. The album was a chartbuster whereas the film was the biggest disaster in Pawan Kalyan’s career.

Plot 
A lady, while searching  her  missing honest police-officer husband, faces inhuman behavior from the local police.When she meets the goon, Saleem, she discovers that he killed her husband. When Saleem is about to kill the woman, she manages to escape and takes shelter in a local temple. It is revealed that she is pregnant with Puli. Saleem makes another attempt to kill her and assumes her to be dead after her fall from a short waterfall. Unbeknownst to him, she is alive and determines to make  Puli a Police officer.

When there is an attack on Prime Minister(P.M) of India by terrorists in Malaysia,  Puli, now an I.P.S officer kills all of them in a fight, saving both the life of P.M and honor of the police. In the subsequent award ceremony, Puli demands and creates a special task force equipped with advanced technology consisting of honest and able police officers with separate uniform for an effective law of order in the city. He sets up 1 rupee police phone booth outside the police stations for anyone who do not get justice or experience complacency in police officers. He leads the special team himself with his trusted officers. In a parallel note, a woman falls for Puli and pretending to be S.I Madhimati , makes Puli fall for her as he is hell bound of marrying a woman police. He forgives and falls for her though he eventually finds she just pretended to be an S.I.

Saleem now a feared gangster , working with another gangster Nikson, commits crimes at unprecedented level, including illegal arms business and black money. He either kills the police men who are not with him or lures them with money.There are thus police in the same lines: ACP Ravi Kumar fears him and the IG has joined hands with him. Thus many police officers fear him to file a case against him. Further, all his crimes are well managed leaving little or no trace.Puli convinces ACP Ravi Kumar to reopen an old case against Saleem, reprimanding him with what the police job meant.The duo taste ill luck due to lack of "evidence" against him. After a small incident involving his car parked in no parking zone, Puli frustrates Saleem and gets his vengeance, now directly confronting his patricide without actually knowing him.

Puli is simultaneously frustrated that all his secrets are getting leaked and his team members get killed one after the other. During a shoot out, Puli finds Nikson as a mole in his team and kills him.Finally, Saleem and Puli face directly with the former capturing the latter's mother. At this point, Puli's mother lets the cat out of the bag about Saleem. An infuriated Puli fights and makes Saleem confess all his crimes, which is broadcast live via a pin hole camera. Thus Puli avenges his mother.

Cast

Production

Development and casting
Puli was director S. J. Suryah's dream project. Initially he planned to make the movie with Akshay Kumar in Hindi and later with Vijay in Tamil and he sent bound scripts to both superstars. But both the projects did not happen. The storyline was also discussed with Malayalam actor Suresh Gopi. Later, after the confirmation from Kalyan, it was finalised to make in Telugu with Pawan Kalyan . Hansika Motwani was originally signed to play the heroine but was replaced by Nikeesha Patel, who made her acting debut in this film. The film was sent to the censor board on 4 September and received an A certificate.

Filming
The movie was shot in various parts of Andhra Pradesh and Tamil Nadu, as well as in Malaysia, Singapore, Bangkok and Dubai. The filming was almost completed by May 2010, but the songs were shot from 18 May onwards only.

Title
The movie was originally titled "Komaram Puli". "Komaram" was taken from the surname of the Gond martyr Komaram Bheem, who fought against the erstwhile Asaf Jahi dynasty for the liberation of Hyderabad State. However, following the objections by Komaram Sony Rao, grandson of Komaram Bheem, and also by a section of Telangana Joint Action Committee activists who called for a boycott of the film, the movie was renamed with title "Puli" on the second day of its release. The soundtrack album is titled "Komaram Puli".

Music

The film features a soundtrack consisting of 6 songs composed by A. R. Rahman and lyrics penned by Chandrabose.  This is the third among Rahman's only three straight Telugu films that are not remakes or bilinguals. The highly anticipated soundtrack album was released on 11 July 2010. The release rights of the album was purchased by Sony Music for 20 million. The audio was launched by K Rosaiah, Rahman and his mother Kareema Begum in a function held at H.I.C.C Novotel, Hyderabad. The function was attended by K Rosaiah, S. J. Suryah, Allu Aravind, Pawan Kalyan, Nikeesha Patel, Shriya Saran, A. R. Rahman, Chandrabose, Anand Sai, Singanamala Ramesh, S. R. Murthy and many others. The soundtrack got overwhelming response and became a hot seller. The audio sales reached a total of 300,000 of CDs in the first three days, which is an all-time record in Telugu film history.

The picturisation of the songs was also noted. Two songs were choreographed by Bollywood choreographer Ahmed Khan. The songs he choreographed were "Power Star" (Pawan Kalyan's introduction song) and "Dochey" (an item number featuring Shriya Saran). The songs were filmed in two schedules at Annapurna Studios beginning from 18 May. Of the six songs written for the film, four songs were directly included in the film while the remaining two served as background songs. Lyricist Chandrabose collaborated with Rahman for the second time through this film. He took almost three months to write the song "Amma Thale", while all it took to write the song "Maaralente" was 90 minutes. A. R. Rahman's original score also received critical praise. Rahman collaborated with artists from three European countries to re-record the background score.

Release

Theatrical

The film was released worldwide with 950 prints in 1,250 theatres, a record of sorts for a Telugu film. The film's release faced a minor roadblock in the form of its title.

Pre-release

Re-release

The makers of the film re-edited it due to very mixed to poor reviews and re-released the shortened version on 15 September 2010.

Reception

Critical response

 The film critic from NDTV warned the audience by saying, "watch the film at your own risk. It's a big-budget film with a solid casting. Just laugh at the poorly directed action scenes." The background score by A. R. Rahman and camerawork by Binod Pradhan were appreciated and many critics rated them as the highlight of the movie.

References

External links 
 

2010 action films
2010 films
2010s police films
2010s Telugu-language films
Films directed by S. J. Suryah
Films scored by A. R. Rahman
Films shot in Dubai
Films shot in Malaysia
Films shot in Singapore
Films shot in Tamil Nadu
Indian action thriller films
Indian police films